St. John's Episcopal Church, named after St. John the Evangelist, is an historic church building located at 609 South Main Street, Moultrie, Georgia, United States. Originally an Episcopal church in the Diocese of Georgia, it is now known as St. Mark's Anglican Church and continues to follow the Anglo-Catholic tradition of worship, but now belongs to the Anglican Church in North America and is a Forward in Faith parish. St. Mark's uses the 2019 Book of Common Prayer (ACNA) and 1940 Hymnal for all services.  It is one of the oldest Christian churches in Colquitt County.

History
Episcopal services began sometime in 1912, when The Rev. J. W. Becker came from Fitzgerald on Thursdays to conduct services in the Presbyterian Church. The next year they were moved to the home of a local member, where now the eastern portion of the Town Terrace Motel is situated.

In 1919, The Reverend R.C. Shannonhouse, was "encouraged to undertake the building of a church." A lot was purchased generally through the efforts of the ladies. Local citizens gave more than $1,000 to the fund, which Episcopalians subscribed to $9,400. Ground was broken for the church on December 5, 1922. Present were The Right Reverend F.F. Reese, Bishop of Georgia, and The Venerable J.B. Lawrence, Archdeacon of the Diocese of Georgia. The church was built of brick and tile, finished with stucco and cement trim, and sat 150 worshippers. Money gave out before the roof was completed; it took nine months to complete construction. With no funds for furnishing, the "congregation sat on a motley array of chairs, discarded benches, etc., brought in from heaven only remembers where!"

On May 24, 1946, St. John's became an organized mission. The first Vicar was Fr. John Saxon-Wolfe. Parish status was achieved May 20, 1958. Fr. Kenneth Gearhart became the first Rector. Meanwhile, the Parish Hall had been built, and two lots to the north of the church were also acquired.

Recent history
In July 2012, the rector, the vestry, and the congregation left the historic church building and founded St. Mark's Anglican Church.  They met temporarily in the chapel of Trinity Baptist Church, and in late 2013, purchased the building from the Diocese of Georgia.  After three months of improvements to the building, St. Mark's first service back in the building was Advent Sunday 2013.

Worship Services
Sunday
 Choral High Mass at 9:00 AM
Wednesday
 Low Mass at 6:00 PM

See also

Anglican realignment
Anglican Church in North America
Anglican Diocese of the South

References

External links

St. Mark's Facebook Page

Buildings and structures in Colquitt County, Georgia
Episcopal church buildings in Georgia (U.S. state)
Christian organizations established in 1912
1912 establishments in Georgia (U.S. state)
Anglo-Catholic church buildings in the United States
Churches completed in 1923